Alone (Again) is a solo piano album by American jazz pianist Bill Evans, recorded in December 1975 but not released until 1977 on Fantasy Records. It was reissued on CD in 1994 by Original Jazz Classics.

Reception

Writing for Allmusic, music critic Scott Yanow wrote of the album "... Evans plays well enough on this set of unaccompanied solos (reissued on CD), but the material is generally not worth the intense explorations that it receives."

Track listing
 "The Touch of Your Lips" (Ray Noble) – 7:07
 "In Your Own Sweet Way" (Dave Brubeck) – 8:59
 "Make Someone Happy" (Jule Styne, Betty Comden, Adolph Green) – 7:14
 "What Kind of Fool Am I?" (Leslie Bricusse, Anthony Newley) – 6:10
 "People" (Jule Styne, Bob Merrill) – 13:37

Personnel
Bill Evans – piano

Additional personnel
Helen Keane – producer
Ray Hall – engineer
Dennis Drake – remastering
Richard Seidel – liner notes

Chart positions

References

External links
The Bill Evans Memorial Library
Jazz Discography

Bill Evans albums
Instrumental albums
1977 albums
Solo piano jazz albums